Alderman's Ford Preserve, is a preserve and park in Hillsborough County, Florida, in the United States. The park has two public access points for automobiles, from Thompson Road and from Florida State Road 39 as well as numerous access points for horse, foot or canoe access only. Eight miles of equestrian trails are located along the southern portion of the park, which borders Alafia River State Park roughly along the border of Jameson Road. A three mile long hiking loop over the Alafia River, a baseball park, picknicking and canoe rental facilities can be accessed at the Highway 39 entrance.

History
In 1893 Hillsborough County contracted B. C. West to build a bridge over the Alafia at Alderman's Ford at a price of $300, but the bridge failed inspection and a new contract was granted to W. T. Pollard to rebuild the bridge for $500. The park has been a public gathering space since at least 1890. An annual political rally drawing thousands of people was held every April.

References

Parks in Hillsborough County, Florida